Scarborough GO Station is a train station served by GO Transit's Lakeshore East line, located in the Scarborough district of Toronto, Ontario, Canada. 

The station is located south of St. Clair Avenue, just west of Midland Avenue, at the end of Reeve Avenue. A footpath connects the community through Natal Park, from the southwest end of the parking lot. Elevator construction was completed in mid-February 2010 making the station fully accessible.

Formerly known as Scarborough Junction, the station had originally been located northeast of St. Clair Avenue on the west side of Midland Avenue, where the Stouffville line now branches off to the north on what was previously the CN Uxbridge Subdivision. The first station built in the 1850s was replaced by a 1871 station that burned down in 1960 in what is now a vacant area. The Scarborough Junction neighbourhood was named after the station.  In 1967, the present station was relocated and opened for GO Transit service.

Connecting transit
Directly served on the street in front of the station by Toronto Transit Commission bus routes 9 Bellamy and 102 Markham Rd, and nearby routes 12 Kingston Rd, 16 McCowan, 20 Cliffside  and 113 Danforth which also allow for discounted transfers when connecting to or from GO Transit trains at this station.

References

External links

GO Transit railway stations
Transport in Scarborough, Toronto
Railway stations in Toronto
Railway stations in Canada opened in 1883
1883 establishments in Ontario